The Huntsville Symphony Orchestra is a symphonic orchestra located in Huntsville, Alabama. The current conductor and music director is Gregory Vajda. Vajda has been the conductor since the 2011-2012 season. The orchestra's resident conductor is Joseph Lee.

History
The Huntsville Symphony was founded in 1955 by Alvin Dreger, a cellist from Huntsville. Forty musicians participated, many of whom were scientists in German rocket scientist Wernher von Braun's team. The symphony's first conductor was Dr. Arthur M. Fraser.

The HSO is the oldest continuously-operating professional orchestra in the state of Alabama. Past conductors include Arthur Fraser (1954-1959), Russell Gerhart (1959-1971), Marx Pales (1971-1988), Taavo Virkhaus (1989-2003) and Carlos Miguel Prieto (2003-2011).

The yearly concert programs include a Classical series, a Pops series and a "Casual Classics" series. Notable guest performers have included renowned cellist Yo-Yo Ma, the Canadian Brass and classical guitarist Manuel Barrueco.

See also
Alabama Symphony Orchestra
Mobile Symphony Orchestra
Tuscaloosa Symphony Orchestra

References

External links
The Huntsville Symphony Orchestra (HSO)
 Huntsville Music History Collection, The University of Alabama in Huntsville Archives and Special Collections
 Alvin Dreger Collection, The University of Alabama in Huntsville Archives and Special Collections

American orchestras
Musical groups from Alabama
Culture of Huntsville, Alabama
Tourist attractions in Huntsville, Alabama
Musical groups established in 1955
1955 establishments in Alabama
Performing arts in Alabama